Félix José Hernández (born 18 April 1972) is a former Venezuelan football midfielder. Between 1996 and 1999, he made a total number of 19 appearances (no goals) for the Venezuela national team. He also played professionally in Mexico and Spain.

References

External links
 (incomplete)
 BDFA profile (incomplete)

1972 births
Living people
Venezuelan footballers
Venezuela international footballers
Association football midfielders
1999 Copa América players
Deportivo Italia players
Club Celaya footballers
Polideportivo Ejido footballers
Deportivo Anzoátegui players
Venezuelan expatriate footballers
Venezuelan expatriate sportspeople in Spain
Venezuelan expatriate sportspeople in Mexico
Expatriate footballers in Spain
Expatriate footballers in Mexico